Giovanni Camillo Glorioso (or Gloriosi) (1572 – 8 January 1643) was an Italian mathematician and astronomer. He was a friend of Marino Ghetaldi and successor of Galileo Galilei in Pisa, then in Padua.

Life 
Giovanni Camillo Glorioso was born in the village of Mercato or Santa Maria a Vico of Giffoni Valle Piana. He had a correspondence with Galileo Galilei in 1604 and he replaced him at the University of Padua, with an income of 350 florins per year, in 1613. He led observations on the 1618 comet, on Mars, and on some aspects of Saturn. He came closer to Antonio Santini (1577-1662) and he had contrasts with Scipione Chiaramonti and his successor at the university of Pisa, Barthélemy Souvey, student of Fortunio Liceti. Glorioso was particularly harsh in his attack on Scipione Chiaramonti's efforts to defend traditional Aristotelian cosmology. He criticised Chiaramonti's De tribus novis stellis and in 1636 Charamonti published a refutation, Examen censurae Gloriosi, to which Glorioso replied the following year Castigatio examinis. To this Chiaramonti responded in turn with Castigatio Ioannis Camilli Gloriosi aduersus Scipionem Claramontium Caesenatem (1638). Glorioso's final contribution to this dispute was his Responsio (1641). As he died soon after, this allowed Chiaramonti the last word, which he took with a volume of more than 500 pages, summarising his Aristotelian positions on a wide range of topics, his Opus Scipionis Claramontis Caesenatis de Universo (1644).

Glorioso considered, following the theme of the parallax, that comets were in fact celestial bodies, against Galileo's opinion. In a 1610 letter to his friend Giovanni Terrenzio, he asserted that Galileo erroneously attributed the invention of the telescope and of the sector to himself, instead to Michel Coignet, accusations that appeared to be unfounded: Rosen (1954) shows that Galileo did not affirm to be the inventor of the telescope, which he called the "Dutch tube", but he considered himself as the inventor of its tools, and that was probably cause of confusion. The situation is the same for what concerns the sector, which, in its different forms, had several inventors. It was excluded, for chronological reasons, that Coignet's tool could have inspired Galileo.

One of his works took the title from the last work of Alexander Anderson, published in 1619 in Paris: Alexandri Andersoni Exercitationum Mathematicarum Decas Prima.
This work shows that Glorioso wrote his algebrical calculations in a language inherited from the algebra of Viète. It's one of the first work to use the notation  for the equivalent of the current .

He died in Naples in 1643.

Family 
Glorioso had a brother, Alessandro, and a sister, Porzia. The properties inherited by the son of his brother Alessandro are in Santa Maria a Vico and in the Serroni di Sei casali.
Giovanni Camillo had other relatives in Mercato di Giffoni Valle Piana, among which the Guardian of San Francesco's convent, brother Hieronimo de Glorioso.

Works

References

Further reading 
 
 M. Bernegger e B. Capra, Ed. ETS, 1992, pp. IX-XLI (d'après la page de l'auteur sur il Laboratorio di Galileo Galilei),  lire en ligne, traduction anglaise Katiuscia Mariottini,  lire en ligne.
 Roberto Vergara Caffarelli, Il compasso geometrico e militare di Galileo Galilei - Testi, annotazioni e disputa negli scritti di G. Galilei, 1992.
 
 Giuseppe Tesauro Falivene, Giovan Camillo Glorioso, Studio in dodici Tomi pp.3800 circa 2014-2020.

External links 

 Page on Michel Coignet: Museo Galileo
 Il compasso di Galileo - storia di un'invenzione

1572 births
1643 deaths
People of the Kingdom of Naples
17th-century Italian mathematicians
17th-century Italian astronomers
University of Naples Federico II alumni
Academic staff of the University of Padua